The Nuba Mountains, located in the West Kordofan and South Kordofan states in the south of Sudan, are inhabited by a diverse set of populations (collectively known as Nuba peoples) speaking various languages not closely related to one another.

The vast diversity of languages among the Nuba Mountains indicates that the mountains served as a retreat area by many people in the past.

Languages 
In addition to Sudanese Arabic, around 42 other languages are spoken in the Nuba Mountains. They belong to the Daju, Hill Nubian, Kadu, Katla, Lafofa, Nyima, Rashad, Talodi–Heiban and Temein language groups. Five of these families (Daju, Hill Nubian, Kadu, Nyima and Temein) belong to the Nilo-Saharan language family, while four (Katla, Lafofa, Rashad and Talodi–Heiban) belong to the Niger–Congo language family. Kadu's relationship to Nilo-Saharan is uncertain; it was previously classified as Niger–Congo, and a conservative classification would consider it an independent family.

Previously, the four Niger–Congo language groups along with the Nilo-Saharan Kadu group were classified together as the Kordofanian languages. However, Kordofanian is no longer considered a valid family.

Almost all of the languages spoken in the Nuba Mountains are indigenous to the mountains and found nowhere else. The only exceptions are the Daju languages, the rest of which belong to Western Daju and are found in eastern Chad, and Sudanese Arabic, which is spoken in the rest of Sudan.

Internal classifications 
The languages of the Nuba Mountains belong to several distinct subdivisions of their respective languages families.

Bold = exclusive to the Nuba Mountains

Niger–Congo 

Niger–Congo
Katla
Rashad
Atlantic–Congo
Lafofa
Talodi–Heiban
Talodi
Heiban

Note: Atlantic–Congo is a major division of Niger–Congo which only excludes the Mande, Ijoid and Dogon languages of West Africa, along with the Katla and Rashad languages of the Nuba Mountains.

Nilo-Saharan 

Nilo-Saharan
Kadu
Eastern Sudanic
Kir–Abbaian
Temein
Daju
Astaboran languages
Nyima
Nubian languages
Hill Nubian

Notes:

 Eastern Sudanic is a large division of Nilo-Saharan spoken throughout the upper Nile region. Kir–Abbaian and Astaboran are the two branches of Eastern Sudanic, roughly distributed in the north and south of the region, respectively.
 The Nubian languages are spoken mostly in northern Sudan and southern Egypt. Only Midob and the extinct Birgid are found in southern Sudan, along with the Hill Nubian languages of the Nuba Mountains.

See also
Kordofanian languages
Languages of Sudan

Further reading
MacDiarmid, P.A. and D.N. MacDiarmid. 1931. The languages of the Nuba Mountains. Sudan Notes and Records 14:149-162.
Stevenson, Roland C. 1956–57. A survey of the phonetics and grammatical structures of the Nuba Mountain languages, with particular reference to Otoro, Katcha and Nyimang. Afrika und Übersee 40:73-84, 93–115; 41:27-65, 117–153, 171–196.

References 

Languages of Sudan
Nuba peoples